Amiram Levin (born 7 July 1946) is a retired Aluf (Major General) of the Israel Defense Forces.

Military and business career
Amiram Levin served in Sayeret Matkal and rose to become its commander. He was commander of the IDF Northern Command, deputy of the Mossad and director and chairman of the  National Roads Company of Israel.

Living people
1946 births
Israeli generals
Israeli Jews
Israeli people of the Six-Day War
Israeli people of the Yom Kippur War